Rugby union in the Cook Islands is a popular sport. It is a tier three rugby playing nation. They began playing international rugby in 1971 and have yet to make the Rugby World Cup. They are currently rated 55th, with 2,258 registered players and 21 clubs.

Governing body
The Cook Islands Rugby Union was founded in 1948, and affiliated to the IRFB in 1995. The Cook Islands Rugby Union are also members of the Pacific Islands Rugby Alliance.

History

As with many Pacific Island nations, rugby has been the main sport since the early 20th century. Visiting ships from Australia, New Zealand, the UK and Japan, have kept the game going. However, Cook Island rugby has mostly taken the form of an informal folk sport until recently.  In the 1990s, Anthony Turua played a major part in formalising the situation, and getting the national side up to standard. Although they did not manage to get into the Rugby World Cup, the Cook Islands have done well in a tough rugby region, and managed to beat Papua New Guinea. As with several of the Pacific Nations, the Cook Islands have tended to do best at rugby sevens.

The Cook Islands have suffered a problem common to many other surrounding nations such as Samoa; with potential players opting to play for bigger nations. Both brothers Graeme and Steve Bachop were eligible to play for the Cook Islands but chose to play for their country of birth New Zealand.

National team
The  Cook Islands national rugby union team began playing international rugby union in 1971. Thus far, the Cook Islands have not made an appearance at any of the Rugby World Cups. They  are very far from the level of Fiji, Samoa and Tonga. They can also supply players for the Pacific Islanders team.

See also 
Cook Islands national rugby union team
Cook Islands national rugby sevens team
Sport in the Cook Islands

External links
 IRB Cook Islands page
 Federation of Oceanian Rugby Unions, Cook Islands page
 Oceania nations, Cook Islands
 Archives du Rugby: Cook Islands

References